Ilya Ivanovich Solovyov (born 20 July 2000) is a Belarusian professional ice hockey defenceman currently playing with the Calgary Wranglers in the American Hockey League (AHL) while under contract as a prospect to the Calgary Flames of the National Hockey League (NHL). Internationally he played for the Belarusian national team at the 2021 World Championship.

Playing career
Solovyov played as a youth in Belarus, developing within the Belarus under-20 national squad while participating in the Belarusian Extraliga (BXL). He was selected 53rd overall in the 2019 CHL Import Draft by the Saginaw Spirit of the Ontario Hockey League (OHL) and made his North American major junior debut in the following 2019–20 season, where he scored seven goals and had 33 assists for 40 points in 53 games.

He was drafted in the seventh round, 205th overall, in the 2020 NHL Entry Draft by the Calgary Flames and returned to Belarus to play with HC Dinamo Minsk of the Kontinental Hockey League (KHL). As a rookie in the 2020–21 season, Solovyov recorded 2 goals and 7 assists for 9 points and 36 penalty minutes in 41 games.

Solovyov was signed to a three-year, entry-level contract with the Calgary Flames on 6 April 2021.

International play
Solovyov represented Belarus at the 2021 IIHF World Championship.

Career statistics

Regular season and playoffs

International

References

External links

2000 births
Living people
Belarusian expatriate ice hockey people
Belarusian expatriate sportspeople in the United States
Belarusian ice hockey defencemen
Calgary Flames draft picks
Calgary Wranglers players
HC Dinamo Minsk players
People from Mogilev
Saginaw Spirit players
Sportspeople from Mogilev Region